John Ward (22 December 1779 – 24 February 1855) was a British politician.

Ward had Holwood House built for him between 1823 and 1826 and resided there.

Ward was a Member of Parliament (MP) for Leominster from 11 Feb 1830 to 2 August 1830.

Ward was High Sheriff of Kent in 1835.

He died aged 75.

References

External links 
 

1779 births
1855 deaths
UK MPs 1830–1831
High Sheriffs of Kent
Members of the Parliament of the United Kingdom for English constituencies
People from Bromley